Dean Horace Griffiths (born 27 January 1980 in Saint Andrew Parish, Jamaica) is a male hurdler from Jamaica, who represented his native country at the 2004 Summer Olympics in Athens, Greece. He set his personal best (48.55) while winning the men's 400m hurdles at the NCAA Championship on 13 June 2003 in Sacramento, California and help Auburn University to a 2nd-place team finish. Also, in 2003 Griffiths was rank seventh best in the world over 400m hurdles and place 5th at the World Athletic Finals in Monaco.

Griffiths was coached by Henry Rolle

Achievements

References

1980 births
Living people
Jamaican male sprinters
Jamaican male hurdlers
Auburn Tigers men's track and field athletes
Athletes (track and field) at the 2004 Summer Olympics
Athletes (track and field) at the 2006 Commonwealth Games
Athletes (track and field) at the 2003 Pan American Games
Athletes (track and field) at the 2007 Pan American Games
Olympic athletes of Jamaica
People from Saint Andrew Parish, Jamaica
Pan American Games medalists in athletics (track and field)
Pan American Games bronze medalists for Jamaica
Commonwealth Games competitors for Jamaica
Medalists at the 2003 Pan American Games
20th-century Jamaican people
21st-century Jamaican people